Dry Creek is a stream in the U.S. state of Missouri. It is a tributary of Flat Creek.

The stream source is west of Elsey and it flows south-south-east parallel to and west of Missouri Route 173. It crosses under Missouri Route 248 west of Cross Roads and continues on to enter the Flat Creek arm of Table Rock Lake.

Dry Creek was so named because it often runs dry.

See also
List of rivers of Missouri

References

Rivers of Barry County, Missouri
Rivers of Stone County, Missouri
Rivers of Missouri